The 1976 World Snooker Championship (also known as the 1976 Embassy World Snooker Championship for sponsorship purposes) was a professional ranking snooker tournament that took place at two venues. This was the first world championship to be sponsored by Embassy; their sponsorship lasted for the next 30 years. Ray Reardon won in the final 27–16 against Alex Higgins.

There were seven century breaks in the championship.

Overview
The World Snooker Championship is an annual professional snooker tournament organised by the World Professional Billiards and Snooker Association (WPBSA). Founded in the late 19th century by British Army soldiers stationed in India, the cue sport was popular in the British Isles. However, in the modern era, which started in 1969 when the World Championship reverted to a knockout format, it has become increasingly popular worldwide, especially in East and Southeast Asian nations such as China, Hong Kong and Thailand.

Joe Davis won the first World Championship in 1927, hosted by the Billiards Association and Control Council, the final match being held at Camkin's Hall in Birmingham, England. The 1976 championship featured sixteen professional players competing in one-on-one snooker matches in a single-elimination format, each match played over several . These competitors in the main tournament were selected using a combination of the top players based on results from the three previous years, and  the winners of a pre-tournament qualification stage.

Tournament detail 
The leading 14 players in the Order of Merit received automatic entry to the final stages and were joined by two winners from the qualifying competition. The leading 8 in the Order of Merit were seeded.

The Middlesbrough Town Hall in Middlesbrough staged the top half of the draw and the Wythenshawe Forum, Manchester, staged the bottom half and the final. The final was held over 4 days from 20 to 23 April.

Champion Ray Reardon won 15–7 against John Dunning including breaks of 106, 81 and 71; Dennis Taylor 15–2 with a break of 115 in the last frame and then his semifinal against Perrie Mans by 20–10 with a top break of 133 plus runs of 85 and 70.

The final, where Reardon had travelled to where Higgins had been playing, was a fractious affair with complaints from Reardon over the quality of the table and the TV lighting. Eventually, the referee was replaced after further complaints from the champion. Higgins had the better of the earlier exchanges, leading 4-2 and 10-9 before Reardon started to dictate both the pace and tactics. The Welshman eventually won, very comfortably, 27–16 to secure his fifth title.

The highest break of the tournament was 138 made by John Spencer in his match against David Taylor. Earlier in the week Eddie Charlton had compiled a break of 137; however, it did not count as a record because the table was not up to standard.

Main draw
Numbers in (parentheses) indicate seeding.

Sources:

Qualifying

References

World Snooker Championships
World Snooker Championship
World Snooker Championship
World Snooker Championship
Sport in Middlesbrough
Sports competitions in Manchester